Sing It All Away is the fourth studio album by Canadian band Walk off the Earth, released on June 16, 2015 by Columbia Records. It was preceded by the release of the first single "Rule the World".

Singles
"Rule the World" was released as the first single to promote Sing It All Away. The music video, directed by John Poliquin, was released on March 31, 2015.

Critical reception
Upon release, Sing It All Away has garnered positive reviews from critics. Stephen Thompson of NPR stated that the album's material "fits neatly alongside the music that inspired it, with tiny strands of disparate genres and influences woven in". However, AllMusic's Marcy Donelson gave a mixed review, giving the album three out of five stars. She stated that the album at some points could be "distracting or delightful", but at the same time praised its songwriting for its sophisticated tone.

Track listing

Charts

References

2015 albums
Walk Off the Earth albums
Columbia Records albums
Albums recorded at Noble Street Studios